Kevin Kayirangwa (born 11 February 1991) also known as Kevin or Kevin K, is the winner of Idool 2011, in season 4 of the Belgian version of Pop Idol. His first album, Thank You, on Sony BMG released in 2011, reached No. 2 in the Ultratop Belgian Flemish Singles Charts.

In May 2012, he joined Dennis De Neyer, a co-contestant of Kevin in the same series and Dean Delannoit, an Idool 2007 season 3 winner to form the Belgian Flemish boyband 3M8S.

Kayirangwa is of Rwandan descent.

Discography

Albums

Singles

*Did not appear in the official Belgian Ultratop 50 charts, but rather in the bubbling under Ultratip charts.

Featured in

Other singles 
2011: "More to Me" (as part of the Idool 2011 Finalists collective) (peaked at No. 1 in Belgian Ultratop)

References

1991 births
Living people
Belgian people of Rwandan descent
Idols (TV series) winners
21st-century Belgian male singers
21st-century Belgian singers